This article displays the qualifying draw of the 2011 Dubai Tennis Championships.

Players

Seeds

Qualifiers

Qualifying draw

First qualifier

Second qualifier

Third qualifier

Fourth qualifier

Fifth qualifier

Sixth qualifier

Seventh qualifier

Eighth qualifier

References
 Qualifying Draw

2011 Dubai Tennis Championships
Dubai Tennis Championships - qualifying
Qualification for tennis tournaments